Tsybuninskaya is a rural locality (a village) in Verkhovskoye Rural Settlement, Tarnogsky District, Vologda Oblast, Russia. The population was 27 as of 2002.

Geography 
Tsybuninskaya is located 45 km southwest of Tarnogsky Gorodok (the district's administrative centre) by road. Patrakeyevskaya is the nearest rural locality.

References 

Rural localities in Tarnogsky District